Mircea Radu Badea (born February 24, 1974, in Bucharest, Romania. He is a Romanian political satirist, television host, media critic, radio personality and occasional actor. He is widely known as host of În gura presei (The Talk of The Press) a show based on the daily news, that airs on Antena 3.

Badea started as a radio host, but later branched into television as a co-host of the Tele7ABC Bună dimineața, România (Good Morning, Romania) morning show. Together with Bună dimineața, România co-host Teo Trandafir, he went on to work for the Intact Media Group and host a show on Antena 1, called Dimineaţa devreme (Early morning), and then hosted another show on Antena 1 called Teo şi Mircea Şou (Teo & Mircea Show). He has also had several film roles as an actor. Badea became the host of În gura presei on Antena 3 in late 2004. Together with longtime friend Călin Stanciu, he is a co-executive-producer of the show. After Badea started În gura presei, he steadily gained popularity and critical acclaim, which also led to enduring controversy and resentment amongst various Romanian media personalities.

Badea has gained significant acclaim as an acerbic, satirical critic of Romanian politics and most Romanian media outlets, in particular the coverage of Realitatea TV, Evenimentul Zilei, or România Liberă. In spite of its type of satire, În Gura Presei and Badea himself have been nominated for a number of entertainment, news and journalism national and international awards.

Early life

Badea was born in 1974 in Bucharest and attended the Tudor Vianu National High School of Computer Science in the early 90s. After graduating, he enrolled as a computer science student at the Bucharest Academy of Economic Studies in Bucharest. Jeana Gheorghiu, a very well known Romanian journalist and a family friend, got him his first job as a radio host in the early 90s.

In 2009 he won an APTR (Romanian Association for Television Programs) award, category "One Man Show".

Filmography

Throughout his career, Mircea Badea has made cameos in various Romanian movies. He mentioned his role in the 1999 Sergiu Nicolaescu-directed Triunghiul morţii (Death Triangle) saying he appeared in the movie because he had serious financial difficulties and was in need of money.

 Oglinda (1993)
 Triunghiul morţii (1999)
 Pitici şi tătici (TV series) - 2003
 Milionari de weekend (2004)
 Live (2015)

Political stance
He used to be a frequent critic of president Traian Băsescu, who in turn made a video clip ridiculing Badea. The video clip begins with president Basescu saying "it's raining outside", followed by a long diatribe of an actor looking like Badea complaining that the rain is supported by taxpayers' money. Badea aired a response the same day, which turned the satire on its head by asking a long series of politically inconvenient questions for the president, to which the "it's raining outside" presidential non-answer is played back. The exchange has received widespread media coverage.

In the last years Badea voiced his criticism against president Klaus Iohannis, the former DNA Chief Prosecutor Laura Codruța Kövesi, the prosecutors, the judges and generally against the so-called #Rezist movement (mostly opponents of Liviu Dragnea and the Social Democratic Party-led government), whom he all sees as representatives of the Romanian secret services and the "parallel state", the Romanian "deep state" held responsible by Liviu Dragnea and the government coalition for misusing the anti-corruption campaign as political means against the PSD-ALDE government.

References

External links 
 „În gura presei” TV Show Recordings
 

1974 births
Living people
Television people from Bucharest
Romanian male television actors
Romanian male film actors
Romanian journalists
Romanian television personalities
Romanian satirists